Louis Sheriff (born 6 September 1992) is an  English rugby league footballer who plays as a  for Featherstone Rovers in the Betfred League 1.

He has played for Hull Kingston Rovers, the Redcliffe Dolphins in Australia, Dewsbury Rams, Gateshead Thunder (two spells, one as a loan) and Doncaster.

Early career
Sheriff came through the youth setup at Hull Kingston Rovers.

Club career

Hull KR
Sheriff made his first team début for Hull Kingston Rovers on 25 April 2011 at home to Harlequins RL, deputising for the injured Shaun Briscoe. On his début he looked confident and managed to get himself onto the scoresheet, earning him the club Man of the Match award.

Hemel Stags
In November 2017 he signed to play for Hemel in the 2018 season.

Sheffield Eagles
In October 2018 Sheriff joined the Sheffield Eagles on a one-year deal but was released in May 2019 and joined Keighley Cougars for the rest of the 2019 season.

Featherstone Rovers
On 4 Jan 2021 it was announced that Sheriff would join Featherstone Rovers

References

1992 births
Living people
Dewsbury Rams players
Doncaster R.L.F.C. players
English rugby league players
Featherstone Rovers players
Hemel Stags players
Hull Kingston Rovers players
Keighley Cougars players
Newcastle Thunder players
Redcliffe Dolphins players
Rugby league fullbacks
Rugby league wingers
Rugby league players from Kingston upon Hull
Sheffield Eagles players